Caroline Cejka (born 29 October 1985) is a Swiss orienteering competitor.

She competed at the 2009 World Orienteering Championships in Miskolc, where she placed 26th in the long distance. She won a bronze medal in the relay with the Swiss team at the 2010 European Orienteering Championships in Primorsko.

References

External links
 

1985 births
Living people
Swiss orienteers
Female orienteers
Foot orienteers